Cherrie Ying Choi-yi (born 20 June 1983), better known as Ting Yim-yi or Ting Man, is a Taiwan-born Hong Kong actress. She moved to New York City at a young age, and later to Hong Kong. Her nickname is "Dingding" (丁丁), and she is often credited under the name Cherrie In.

Career 
After making her film debut in Fulltime Killer, Ting caught the attention of Charles Heung's wife, Tiffany Chen, and was signed to a contract with China Star Entertainment Group. Since then, Ting has been working consistently as an actress and continues to gain popularity in the Hong Kong cinema.

Personal life 
Ting married actor and singer Jordan Chan on 14 February 2010 (Valentine's Day) at 12:30pm. The couple held their wedding at The Little White Wedding Chapel in Las Vegas, Nevada, U.S.

Their first child, a son named Jasper, was born on 1 July 2013. On 29 May 2020, they welcomed their second child, a baby boy nicknamed Ho Ho.

Filmography

References

External links
Official Sina blog 
CherrieYing.net

HK cinemagic entry

1983 births
Living people
Actresses from Taipei
Hong Kong film actresses
Taiwanese emigrants to Hong Kong
Hong Kong television actresses
Taiwanese film actresses
Taiwanese television actresses
21st-century Hong Kong actresses
The Amazing Race contestants
Taiwanese-born Hong Kong artists